Myroides profundi is a Gram-negative, aerobic and non-motile bacterium from the genus of Myroides which has been isolated from  deep-sea sediments from the southern Okinawa Trough.

References

Flavobacteria
Bacteria described in 2009